Spirit of St. Louis is the second studio album by American singer and actress Ellen Foley, released in March 1981. Foley is backed by The Clash on all songs. The album was recorded right after The Clash's Sandinista! with the same musicians and engineers. Foley was dating Clash guitarist Mick Jones at the time. The album charted at No. 57 UK.

Track listing

Charts

Personnel

Performers
Ellen Foley – vocals

The Clash
Mick Jones – guitar, vocals
Joe Strummer – guitar
Paul Simonon – bass
Topper Headon – drums

Additional musicians
Tymon Dogg – violin
Mickey Gallagher – keyboards
Davey Payne – saxophone
John Turnbull – guitar
Norman Watt-Roy – bass guitar

Production
Mick Jones ("My Boyfriend") – producer
Bill Price – recording engineer, mixing
Jeremy Green – assistant engineer
Pennie Smith – photography

References
http://www.discogs.com/Ellen-Foley-Spirit-Of-St-Louis/master/52177
http://www.amazon.com/Spirit-St-Louis-Foley-Ellen/dp/B00001NFLJ

Specific

1981 albums
Ellen Foley albums
Epic Records albums